Canas or Cañas may refer to:

Places
 Canas (Lycia), a town of ancient Lycia, now in Turkey
 Amatlán de Cañas, a municipality in Nayarit, Mexico
 Cañas Canton, in Guanacaste province, Costa Rica
 Cañas, Costa Rica, capital of the Cañas canton
 Cañas, La Rioja, in Spain
 Canas, Peru, a province in the Cusco Region of Peru
 Canas, São Paulo, a municipality in the state of São Paulo in Brazil
 Canas de Senhorim, a town in the municipality of Nelas, Portugal
 Universidad Centroamericana "José Simeón Cañas", in El Salvador
 Villar de Cañas, a municipality in Cuenca, Spain
 Canas, Ponce, Puerto Rico, a barrio
 Canas Urbano, a barrio of Ponce, Puerto Rico
 Cañas, Los Santos, Panama

Fictional Characters
 Canas, a Shaman in the video game Fire Emblem: The Blazing Blade

Other uses
 Canas (surname)

See also 
 Cañas River (disambiguation)